Emani Johnson (December 27, 1998 – October 11, 2021), better known as Emani 22, was an American R&B singer. She was from Lancaster, California. She collaborated with Trippie Redd on the songs "Emani's Interlude" and "Fire Starter", from his 2018 mixtape A Love Letter to You 3.

References

External links
 
 

1998 births
2021 deaths
American rhythm and blues singers
21st-century African-American women singers
People from Lancaster, California
Accidental deaths in the United States